Regress may refer to:

 Regress argument, a problem in epistemology concerning the justification of propositions
 Infinite regress, a problem in epistemology

See also
 Regression (disambiguation)